The Ministry of Culture, Community and Youth (MCCY; ;) is a ministry of the Government of Singapore responsible for the formulation and implementation of policies related to the arts, sports, youth and community in Singapore.

History 
The MCCY was formed on 1 November 2012 as part of a structural reform by the then Ministry of Community Development, Youth and Sports (MCYS). The MCYS became the Ministry of Social and Family Development (MSF) and transferred several of its portfolios, such as Youth Development and Sports to MCCY.

In 2022, the Ministry appointed members of the first disciplinary panel to handle moderate to severe cases of misconduct for member organisations under the Safe Sport Programme.

Statutory Boards

Hindu Endowments Board
Majlis Ugama Islam Singapura
National Arts Council
National Heritage Board
National Youth Council
People's Association
Sport Singapore
School of the Arts
Singapore Art Museum
National Gallery Singapore
Singapore Sports School
The Esplanade

Ministers

The Ministry is headed by the Minister for Culture, Community and Youth, who is appointed as part of the Cabinet of Singapore.
The incumbent minister is Edwin Tong from the People's Action Party.

References

External links
 
 MCCY Singapore Official Youtube Channel

2012 establishments in Singapore
Community
Singapore
Singapore
Singapore
Singapore